The Young OG Project is the sixth studio album by American rapper Fabolous; it was released on December 25, 2014, by Def Jam Recordings, Desert Storm Records and Street Family Records. The album features guest appearances from Chris Brown, Velous, French Montana, Tish Hyman and more. It also includes production from Vinylz, Boi-1da, C-Sick and The Mekanics, among others. The album is supported by the lone single, "Lituation".

Background
Fabolous said that the album would be "very '90s-inspired and '90s-themed". "I was introduced to hip-hop in the '80s, but the '90s is when it flourished and you saw different people, different styles and different regions emerge it was a very diverse and versatile time and that's another reason why it sticks to me," he told MTV. He said that the whole goal for the album was about his perspective of the '90's, where he came from and where he is today. He also said that it could bring back memories of the guys who really lived in it and it could influence the people who didn't live in it, they could also go in the vibe of it or look up the songs where it came from.

Critical response

The Young OG Project received positive reviews from music critics. Andrew Gretchko of HipHopDX said, "It’s an album filled with features – Rich Homie Quan, Chris Brown, French Montana and even Kevin Hart – and beats that are a mix of the wavy, electronic sounds so prevalent today and the anthemic rhythms of ‘90s-style tracks, each with plenty of bass to back the lyrics. With intros delivered by The Notorious B.I.G. and even a sampling of Drake’s “Fancy” flow, The Young OG Project has tracks for fans of the many subgenres of Hip Hop, from ‘90s beats to both commercial and street hooks. And while Fabolous may not excel on all of the album’s bouncier tracks the way he does over the laid back beats, his Christmas present to the world hits the right notes."

David Jeffries of AllMusic said, "While 2014 was supposed to see the sequel to Fabolous' 2009 release Losos Way, the album The Young OG Project landed instead, celebrating the rapper's love of '90s hip-hop. As such, old-school act Brand Nubian get a righteous tribute with the opening "Lituation," but it takes until track three for the sound of the decade to power the aptly titled "All Good," while later, "Bish Bounce" bumps like Das EFX in their prime. Otherwise, the 1990s influence is less palpable as cloud rap beats ("We Good" floats, stutters, and dissolves) and an appearance from comedian Kevin Hart (during the Digable Planets-ish highlight "Cinnamon Apple") make this an album for the 2014–2015 season, while guest appearances from Rich Homie Quan, Chris Brown, and French Montana are as populist as they are contemporary. Still, Fabolous is invigorated by this slight slide into the past, and offers up numerous highlights (including the not-yet-mentioned "Ball Drop," a great New Year's Eve cut where everything is renewed) with a strong second line in support.

Commercial performance
The album debuted at number 12 on the Billboard 200 chart, with first-week sales of 71,000 copies in the United States. In its second week, the album dropped to number 20 on the chart, selling 25,000 copies, bringing its total album sales to 96,000 copies.

Track listing

Sample credits
"All Good" contains samples of "Juicy" as performed by The Notorious B.I.G., "Slow Motion" as performed by Juvenile featuring Soulja Slim, and "I Think I've Got A Good Chance Pt. 2" by J.J. Barnes.
"Gone For The Winter" contains a sample of "Thief of Bagdad" as performed by Lee Erwin.
"She Wildin'" contains a sample of "Oochie Wally" as performed by Nas & Bravehearts.

Personnel
Credits adapted from AllMusic.

Thomas Bangalter - Composer
Darius Barnes - Composer
Jimmy Barnes - Composer
Diane Bernstein - Composer
Dwight Brandon - Composer
Chris Brown - Composer, Primary Artist
Johnathan Burks - Composer
Keith Carter - Composer
Shawn Carter - Composer
Avery Chambliss - Composer
Evans J. Clark - Composer
Sean Combs - Composer
Ted Creech - Composer
Kaseem Dean - Composer
Mike Dean - Composer
Charles Dumazer - Composer
Michael Epps - Composer
Lee Erwin - Composer
Jared Evans - Composer
Fabolous - Primary Artist
French Montana - Primary Artist
Aubrey "Drake" Graham - Composer
Abir Haronni - Composer, Primary Artist
Clifford Harris - Composer
Kevin Hart - Primary Artist
Mark Henry - Composer
Anderson Hernandez - Composer
Michael Hernandez - Composer
Christo Homem - Composer
Tish Hyman - Primary Artist
Detric Jamal Jackson - Composer
John Jackson - Composer
Ahmad Jackson - Composer
Aubry Johnson - Composer
Jabari Jones - Composer
Malik Yusef Jones - Composer
Nasir Jones - Composer
Chris Justice - Composer
Karim Kharbouch - Composer
Dequantes Devontay Lamar - Composer
Didier Malherbe - Composer
Ted Mills - Composer
Alberto Moreno - Composer
Timothy Mosley - Composer
James Mtume - Composer
William Neale - Composer
Eugene O'Grey - Composer
Jean Claude "Poke" Oliver - Composer
Lamont Porter - Composer
Rich Homie Quan - Primary Artist
Javon Reynolds - Composer
Sidney Reynolds - Composer
Terrell Roberts - Composer
Elon Rutberg - Composer
Matthew Samuels - Composer
Noah Shebib - Composer
Che Smith - Composer
Velous - Primary Artist
Christopher Wallace - Composer
Derek Watkins - Composer
Hermon Weems - Composer
Kanye West - Composer
Jesse Woodard - Composer
Ozan Yildirim - Composer
Cydel Young - Composer
Henry Zant - Composer

Charts

Weekly charts

Year-end charts

References

2014 albums
Fabolous albums
Def Jam Recordings albums
Albums produced by Boi-1da
Albums produced by C-Sick
Albums produced by Vinylz